Stefano Sorrentino (born 28 March 1979) is an Italian former footballer. A professional goalkeeper for his whole career, he is currently a football agent, as well as owner/chairman of Chieri in the Serie D league.
 
Sorrentino played for several Italian clubs throughout his career, being mainly known for his time with Torino, Chievo and Palermo, winning a Serie B title and promotion to Serie A with the latter side in the 2013–14 season. Abroad, he represented AEK Athens in Greece and Recreativo of Spain.

Club career

Early years / Torino
Born in Cava de' Tirreni, Campania, Sorrentino started playing football with S.S. Lazio, finishing his youth training with Juventus F.C. in 1997 and failing to collect any official first-team appearances during his one-season spell. In the summer of 1998 he joined Torino F.C. in Serie B, only playing once in the league.

In the next two years, Sorrentino played in Serie C1, representing S.S. Juve Stabia and A.S. Varese 1910 on loan. He returned to Torino in the 2001 off-season, being a backup in the top division (twelve games) and an undisputed starter in the second level during his tenure; in his final campaign he made 43 league appearances for Toro, who finished second and promoted via the playoffs, only to be denied due to financial irregularities.

AEK
In the 2005 off-season, however, the Turin-based club declared bankruptcy and consequently released all its players. Sorrentino then signed with AEK Athens F.C. but, after the birth of his daughter, he asked president Demis Nikolaidis to let him return to Italy because his wife was not feeling comfortable enough in Greece. However, no ideal offer was made, and the player made it clear that if he had to stay in the country, he would be 100% professional; on 21 November 2006 he had a top-notch performance in a 1–0 home win against A.C. Milan for the group stage of the UEFA Champions League, also being named Player of the match.

In July 2007, after failing to win any silverware in two seasons, Sorrentino was loaned to Recreativo de Huelva, with the Spanish side having the option to sign him on a full basis at the end of the campaign. He made his La Liga debut on 26 August in a 1–1 home draw to Real Betis, and eventually appeared in all league games as the Andalusians eventually avoided relegation, ranking 16th.

Chievo
After Recreativo did not exercise the buying option, Sorrentino returned to his country and signed with A.C. ChievoVerona – freshly promoted to the top flight – initially on loan. He played in 32 league games during the season as the team retained their newly found status, and the move was made permanent on 12 June 2009.

On 30 June 2010, Chievo was reported to have agreed with Genoa C.F.C. to swap Sorrentino for Riccardo Meggiorini, as well as signing Brazilian Rubinho as their new goalkeeper. However, the deal collapsed as Meggiorini moved to Bologna FC 1909; in the following campaigns, he continued to perform solidly.

Palermo
On 25 January 2013, after a long negotiation, Sorrentino signed a -year contract with U.S. Città di Palermo for €4 million. He made his debut two days later, in a 1–1 draw at Cagliari Calcio.

Return to Chievo
On 1 July 2016, 37-year-old Sorrentino agreed to a two-year deal with former side Chievo for an undisclosed fee. During his second spell at the Stadio Marc'Antonio Bentegodi, he continued to be first-choice.

In April 2019, it was announced that Sorrentino's contract would not be renewed, meaning that he would be leaving after eight seasons in total. He did not appear in any of the final matches, however, as he was left out of the squad once their top-tier relegation had been sealed mathematically, and posted on Twitter before the final fixture: "I would have liked to wear these gloves tomorrow. To say goodbye to the fans, my teammates. 271 appearances with this shirt. I would've imagined a different ending. An ending with the 'Eyes of the Tiger.' But beyond the players, there is the shirt. For this I will always say: THANK YOU, CHIEVO!" In total, he collected 271 appearances with the club in all competitions, with his final appearance coming in a 3–1 home loss to S.S.C. Napoli on 14 April, a result which sealed the team's fate. Ahead of their final fixture of the campaign, where they finished last, he posted on Twitter: "I wish to whoever will take my place, to whoever will take my locker, to whoever will wear the Chievo shirt after me, to sweat, struggle, and fight. Always with the eyes of the tiger. Because I will always carry this shirt and this changing room in my heart. Thank you to everyone." However, he also later announced that he would not be retiring from football, and that he would still continue to play and look for a new team after becoming a free agent, in hope of playing his 400th Serie A match.

Retirement and amateur career
On 21 January 2020, Sorrentino announced his retirement from professional football on Sky Sport's television program Calciomercato. However, on 27 January 2020, Sorrentino announced his transfer to Seconda Categoria side Cervo, coached by his father Roberto, and that he would play as a striker.

In June 2021 he retired permanently, and fully engaged in his new career as a football agent, representing Palermo goalkeeper Alberto Pelagotti.

In March 2022, he acquired a majority stake of Serie D club Chieri.

Style of play
A talented and acrobatic goalkeeper, Sorrentino was known for his penalty-stopping abilities as well as his extraordinary shot-stopping, reflexes and ability to produce spectacular and decisive saves. Experienced and consistent, he also drew praise for his work-rate, determination, leadership and longevity. With 14 stops in 363 appearances between 2001 and 2019, he has parried the joint–seventh–most penalties in Serie A history, alongside Francesco Antonioli.

Sorrentino noted that his position on the pitch tended to change depending on whether he was playing behind a three or four-man back-line; in the former case, he usually played in a deeper position closer to the goal. Antonio Di Natale described him as one of the best Italian goalkeepers of his generation.

Although primarily a goalkeeper, Sorrentino came out of retirement to play as a striker in the lower divisions of Italian football.

Three-sided football
Sorrentino played in a three-sided football tournament held in Madrid, in June 2018.

Personal life
Sorrentino's father, Roberto, was also a goalkeeper, who acted as captain for Calcio Catania. He has two brothers.

On 9 June 2002, Sorrentino married Antonella Parrella in Turin – the couple had already been living together for ten months. Together they had three daughters, Carlotta, Matilda and Maria Vittoria; they later separated.

Sorrentino has been in a relationship with Sara Ruggeri since 2012. He and his partner have a daughter, Viola, who was born on 16 September 2013. On 31 December 2018, he proposed to her by giving her a pair of his goalkeeping gloves with the text "Sara, mi vuoi sposare?" (Sara, do you want to marry me?). He later announced his engagement on his official Instagram account by posting a picture of Ruggeri with the gloves and her engagement ring, with the caption "HA DETTO SÌ!!!!" ("She said yes!"); the couple were wed on 27 May 2019.

In March 2017, Sorrentino released his autobiography: Gli occhi della Tigre ("The eyes of the Tiger," in Italian).

Career statistics

Honours
Palermo
Serie B: 2013–14

Notes

References

Bibliography
Stefano Sorrentino, Marco Dell'Olio, Gli occhi della Tigre, Florence, Mandragora, 2017,  (The eyes of the Tiger).

External links

Chievo official profile 
Assocalciatori profile 

1979 births
Living people
People from Cava de' Tirreni
Footballers from Campania
Italian footballers
Association football goalkeepers
Serie A players
Serie B players
Torino F.C. players
S.S. Juve Stabia players
S.S.D. Varese Calcio players
A.C. ChievoVerona players
Palermo F.C. players
Super League Greece players
AEK Athens F.C. players
La Liga players
Recreativo de Huelva players
Italian expatriate footballers
Expatriate footballers in Greece
Expatriate footballers in Spain
Italian expatriate sportspeople in Greece
Italian expatriate sportspeople in Spain
Sportspeople from the Province of Salerno